Harry Burgess may refer to:

Harry Burgess (footballer) (1904–1957), footballer for England, Stockport County, Sheffield Wednesday and Chelsea
Harry Burgess (governor) (1872–1933), governor of the Panama Canal Zone
Harry Burgess, singer from Adult Jazz

See also
Henry Burgess (disambiguation)